Amira Mohamed Ali (born 16 January 1980) is a German politician and member of the Bundestag since 2017. Since 12 November 2019, she has been the parliamentary co-chairperson of The Left alongside Dietmar Bartsch.

Life 
Amira Mohamed Ali was born  in Hamburg and grew up in Hamburg-Fuhlsbüttel. Her father is from Egypt and her mother is German. After graduating from the Gelehrtenschule des Johanneums in Hamburg-Winterhude in 1998, Mohamed Ali studied law at the universities of Heidelberg and Hamburg, where she began and completed her studies. She completed her legal clerkship at the Higher Regional Court of Oldenburg between 2005 and 2007.

She was admitted to the bar in 2008 and worked as an in-house lawyer and contract manager for an automotive supplier until 2017. She is a member of IG Metall and the German Animal Welfare Association.

Mohamed Ali is married and has lived in Oldenburg since 2005.

Political activity 
Mohamed Ali has been a board member of the Oldenburg/Ammerland district association of the party Die Linke in Lower Saxony since 2015. She ran for political office for the first time in the 2016 local elections on list number 2 in electoral district VI of the city of Oldenburg. In this election, the Left Party achieved its best result in a local election since its foundation.

Mohamed Ali ran as a direct candidate for the Oldenburg-Ammerland constituency in the 2017 federal election. She was elected number 5 on her party's Lower Saxony state list and was elected to the Bundestag through that list. In the 19th Bundestag, she is a member of the Committee for Legal Affairs and Consumer Protection and the Committee for Food and Agriculture. She was spokesperson for consumer protection and for animal protection of the Left parliamentary group in the Bundestag.

On 12 November 2019, she was elected as Sahra Wagenknecht's successor–alongside Dietmar Bartsch–as co-chair of the parliamentary group. Mohamed Ali won in a competitive vote against Caren Lay, 36 votes to 29.

Political positions 
Like her predecessor Wagenknecht, Mohamed Ali is considered part of the left wing of her party. In contrast to Wagenknecht, she is open to a possible red-red-green coalition.

References

External links 

 Biography at the Bundestag
 Amira Mohamed Ali at abgeordnetenwatch.de
 Official website
 Profile on the website of the Left Party faction in the Bundestag
 Jung & Naiv: 

1980 births
Living people
Members of the Bundestag for Lower Saxony
Members of the Bundestag 2021–2025
Members of the Bundestag 2017–2021
Female members of the Bundestag
Politicians from Hamburg
German people of Egyptian descent
Members of the Bundestag for The Left
21st-century German women politicians